Melissa Maia de Sousa, better known as Mel Maia (born May 3, 2004), is a Brazilian actress. She was born in Rio de Janeiro.

She rose to fame in 2012 when she played young Rita in the telenovela Avenida Brasil. She received multiple awards for the said role.

Filmography

Awards and nominations

References

External links 
 

2004 births
Living people
Brazilian telenovela actresses
Actresses from Rio de Janeiro (city)